Annandale High School is a public high school in Annandale, Virginia, United States. It is part of the Fairfax County Public Schools system.

The school's student body has been well-recognized for its high level of racial and cultural diversity since at least the 1980s. Students derive from over 90 countries and speak more than 50 languages.

The school's diverse student body has been noted by multiple US presidential administrations. In 1998, AHS was chosen by then-President Bill Clinton's Race Initiative Advisory Board as the site and focus of round-table discussions on race and education. In 2006, Secretary of Education Margaret Spellings visited Annandale to commend the school's diverse language programs, and to announce a $188,000 grant for Fairfax County Public Schools to expand Arabic and Chinese programs. And in October 2011, AHS was visited by First Lady Michelle Obama and First Lady of South Korea Kim Yoon-ok, who spoke at a school ceremony celebrating education and the school's diverse ethnic composition.

AHS is the publishing site and focus of The A-Blast Newspaper, a YJDP paper of The Washington Post that was consistently honored as one of the top-ten high school newspapers in the country from the late 1990s to 2009 by the National Scholastic Press Association and the Columbia Scholastic Press Association.

Historically AHS has also had a competitive football program. The Atoms have won six state championships since 1965, and were ranked as the best high school football team in the country by the National Sports Service after completing an undefeated season in 1978. The team has seen district-wide and sporadic statewide success since the mid-1990s.

Recent history and programs

Recognition of diversity
Annandale was chosen in 1998 as the site and focus of the Race Initiative Advisory Board's round-table discussions on race and education. The event was hosted by members of the board, including Thomas Kean and William Winter, and chaired by historian John Hope Franklin. The discussions were held as part of President Bill Clinton's One America Initiative.

In 2006, then-Secretary of Education Margaret Spellings visited Annandale to announce that a $188,000 grant would be given to Fairfax County Public Schools to expand Arabic and Chinese programs, as part of the National Security Language Initiative. At the time, Annandale students taking Arabic were among "the less than 1 per cent of high school students studying languages deemed critical."

In October 2011, AHS was again noted by the White House for its cultural diversity, hosting a visit by First Lady Michelle Obama and First Lady of South Korea Kim Yoon-ok, both of whom praised the school's widespread ethnic make-up in speeches to the student body. During her address, Obama said of AHS, “This is the perfect place for you to find out who you are and what you want to become, and that’s really what education is all about.” The visits were accompanied by a ceremony featuring Grammy-nominated violinist Jennifer Koh. At the time, Madame Kim was traveling on a state visit to the US with her husband, Korean President Lee Myung-bak, who were invited as guests of honor to a White House dinner that week after Congress approved the Korea-US Free Trade Agreement. During the 2009–2010 school year, Korean and other Asian-Americans represented 22 percent of the AHS student body.

Demographics
In 2011–2012, Annandale's student body was 32.28% Hispanic, 24.97% Asian, 23.97% White, 16.37% Black and 2.41% other. During the 2011–2012 school year, 51.89% of the student body received free or reduced price lunch. 74.79% of the school was proficient in English. No single racial group formed the majority. AHS is considered one of the most diverse schools among FCPS, itself one of the most diverse school districts in the country.

The 2009–2010 school year marked the first year that Hispanic students represented a plurality of Annandale students, and the first year in the school's history that any racial group other than White students represented a plurality within the student body. In fact, White students represent the only group not to see consistent growth in percentage student body representation over the last three years.

The A-Blast
The A-Blast is Annandale High School's student-run, student-sponsored newspaper. It achieved several awards and recognitions from the late 1990s to 2009, during which the paper won a number of National Scholastic Press Association Pacemaker Awards, placed among the Best-in-Show at a variety of NSPA national conventions, and won the Columbia Scholastic Press Association Gold Crown Award (in 2009). The A-Blast has also been a national fore-runner among high school papers for publishing online content, being one of the first fourteen newspapers in the country to be awarded the NSPA's Pacemaker Award for an  Online Edition. The A-Blast, in 2009, had adopted a new multimedia program which trains journalism students to create projects pertaining to the news around Annandale High School, and is currently in its fourth production year.

The A-Blast is a The Washington Post Young Journalists Development Program Paper. The paper's writers and editors receive publishing and content-related guidance from Post professional staff, and periodically visit The Washington Post headquarters in Washington, D.C., for collaborative workshops. A-Blast editors regularly participate in Post programs for high school students, including the High School Writing Seminar and the High School Journalism Workshop. The A-Blast is printed on The Washington Post press in Springfield, VA.

The A-Blast uses WordPress as its technology platform and is hosted by School Newspapers Online.

Football program
In 50 years, Annandale has won six football state championships (1965, 1967, 1972, 1978, 1993, and 1994) and numerous district titles as a member of both the Potomac District (pre-redistricting) and the Patriot District (post-redistricting). They are now in the National District.  After an undefeated season in 1978, Annandale ended the year ranked #1 in the nation by the National Sports Service. Annandale won Patriot District titles in 2005, 2006,2007, and 2009 (shared with West Springfield High School), but the Atoms fell to their first round opponents each year.

Additional history
Opening its doors in 1954, Annandale High School had 1,000 students, ranging in grades eight-eleven. During this time, the students voted to call themselves "Atoms" after the influence from president Dwight D. Eisenhower's speech called "Atoms for Peace."  
In the late 1980s, Annandale High School was involved in the creation of the Thomas Jefferson High School for Science and Technology (TJHSST), ranked as the best high school in the country in 2010 by U.S. News & World Report.  TJHSST is one of 18 Virginia Governor's Schools.

The former Thomas Jefferson High School (Jefferson, TJHS), originally occupied the FCPS building of the current TJHSST.  Over a two-year period, from 1985 to 1987, the Jefferson students were merged into Annandale.  The former TJHS students, now Annandale seniors, were appropriately given the one-time special distinction to use a dual name, TJHS/AHS, for school year 1987–88.  No students from Jefferson or TJHSST graduated in 1988.

Academics

Rankings
Annandale High School was ranked #122, with a score of 1.391, in The Washington Post's 2010 Challenge Index, an annual ranking of public high schools in the Washington Metropolitan Area. Each school's score, and rank, was based on a simple formula: "divide the number of Advanced Placement, International Baccalaureate or other college-level tests a school gave in 2009 by the number of graduating seniors." 172 schools were ranked in 2010. In 2008 Annandale placed #105 (out of 166) in the Challenge Index, with a score of 1.542, and in 2007 it was ranked #107 (out of 190), with a score of 1.425.

Annandale/Fairfax County Public Schools realignment
In early 2010, the Annandale Border Control Force was established by local parent and community groups. Their goal was to realign the school borders by sending residents of Annandale to adjacent county schools such as Falls Church High School and sending Springfield residents to Lake Braddock Secondary School in an effort to address the overcrowding at Annandale High School.  The issue has been long and contentious with some residents and students loyal to Annandale.  Several options for preventing the realigning and reassigning of students of certain housing developments to different middle and high schools were suggested to the county school board.  A major concern to the Annandale parent and community groups included losing sections of the Annandale community which would change the diverse demographics of the school.

Enrollment
Enrollment at AHS during the 2009–2010 school year was 2,257 students. Enrollment at the school reached over 2,000 students for the first time during the 1995–1996 school year. After that year, enrollment grew each year for a decade before reaching 2,568 students during the 2003–2004 school year. Since then, enrollment has experienced non-streaking growth and decline, though has remained at over 2,000 students. During the 2007–2008 school year, enrollment reached a ten-year low of 2,045 students.

Academic programs
AHS has the following FCPS Programs:
Advancement Via Individual Determination (AVID)
Early Identification Program (EIP)
English for Speakers of Other Languages (ESOL)
International Baccalaureate Middle Years Program (IBMYP)
International Baccalaureate Program (IB)
Transitional High School Program
 Special Education- servicing Learning Disabilities, Emotional Disabilities, MR/DD Autism and MOD.
 In addition to standard foreign languages (Latin, French, Spanish), Arabic is offered, making Annandale one of the few high schools in the country to offer such a program.

Notable alumni
Atia Abawi, Author and Former CNN and NBC News foreign correspondent; graduated Annandale High School in 1999.
Jim Acosta, CNN Chief White House Correspondent; graduated Annandale High School 1989.
 Larry Asante, safety for Tampa Bay Buccaneers, Oakland Raiders; 5th round draft pick in 2010. (Did not graduate from Annandale; graduated from Hayfield Secondary School).
 Tony Cavalero, actor, played Dewey Finn on Nickelodeon's "School of Rock."
 Roger Craig, Class of 1995, recurrent Jeopardy! contestant who holds a number of the show's all-time records.
 Ray Crittenden, professional football player for New England Patriots (1993–94), San Diego Chargers (1997) and CFL (1995–96).
 James R. Clapper, Director of National Intelligence, retired Lieutenant General of U.S. Air Force. (Did not graduate from Annandale).
 Amanda Cromwell, head coach for UCLA Bruins women's soccer team and former United States women's national soccer team player.
 Claire G. Gastanaga, former Chief Deputy Attorney General of Virginia,  now Executive Director of the ACLU of Virginia
 Faisal Gill, former Senior Policy Advisor at Department of Homeland Security.
 Clarence Goodson, professional soccer player San Jose Earthquakes of Major League Soccer. (Did not graduate from AHS.)
 Dave Grohl, rock musician, instrumentalist, and singer-songwriter; lead vocalist, guitarist, and songwriter for Foo Fighters, drummer for Nirvana. (Did not graduate from AHS.)
 Fawn Hall, former secretary to Lt. Colonel Oliver North, notable figure in Iran-Contra Affair.
 Bill Hamid, professional American soccer player for D.C. United.
 Mark Hamill, actor and voice artist, best known for playing Luke Skywalker in original Star Wars trilogy. (Did not graduate from AHS.)
 Andrew C. Hollingsworth, class of 1996, NCAA record-setting collegiate football player (Towson University), first team Consensus All-American 
 Mark Hoppus, bass guitarist and vocalist, co-founder and member of Blink-182 and +44, host of Hoppus on Music. (Did not graduate from AHS.)
 Rob Huebel, comedian and actor, known for playing Owen Maestro in television series Childrens Hospital, and himself in series Human Giant; voice of Anchorman in Despicable Me.
 Susan Hutchison (Susan Sylvester), television news journalist, politician (Class of 1972)
 Robin Jennings, former MLB player (Chicago Cubs, Oakland Athletics, Colorado Rockies, Cincinnati Reds).
 Patricia Mernone, Class of 1957, sports car racer in the 1960s
 George Nolen, Class of 1974, CEO, Siemens USA (2003 - 2009)
 Michael Vitez, journalist for The Philadelphia Inquirer, and winner of the 1997 Pulitzer Prize in Explanatory Journalism
 Dylan Walsh, class of 1981, actor, known for his role as Dr. Sean McNamara in television series Nip Tuck and as Detective Al Burns in series Unforgettable.

Literature
Kugler, Eileen Gale (2003). Debunking the Middle-Class Myth: Why Diverse Schools Are Good For All Kids. Scarecrow Education Press.

References

External links
AHS School Website
FCPS School Profile
Official Athletics Website
Article link moved from middle of page
Washington Post article

Educational institutions established in 1954
Public high schools in Virginia
High schools in Fairfax County, Virginia
International Baccalaureate schools in Virginia
Annandale, Virginia
1954 establishments in Virginia